Mamureh (also Romanized as Ma‘mūreh and Ma‘mūrah) is a village in Gandoman Rural District, Gandoman District, Borujen County, Chaharmahal and Bakhtiari Province, Iran. At the 2006 census, its population was 577, in 139 families. The village is populated by Lurs.

References 

Populated places in Borujen County
Luri settlements in Chaharmahal and Bakhtiari Province